Sentinel-3A is a European Space Agency Earth observation satellite dedicated to oceanography which launched on 16 February 2016. It was built as a part of the Copernicus Programme, and is the first of four planned Sentinel-3 satellites. Its sister satellite, Sentinel-3B, launched on 25 April 2018. After completing initial commissioning, each satellite was handed over to EUMETSAT for the routine operations phase of the mission. Two recurrent satellites - Sentinel-3C and Sentinel-3D - will follow in approximately 2024 and 2028 respectively to ensure continuity of the Sentinel-3 mission.

Mission history
In October 2015, the Sentinel-3A launch was planned for December 2015, but delays in transportation from Cannes to the Plesetsk Cosmodrome postponed the launch to January 2016. The spacecraft arrived at Talagi Airport aboard an Antonov An-124 on 28 November. By 17 December, Sentinel-3A completed pre-launch testing and was placed into storage for the Christmas break, lasting until 11 January 2016. After the break, launch was scheduled for 4 February, but while the spacecraft was being fuelled for launch, Khrunichev Space Center in Moscow determined that the launch pad needed to be recertified, resulting in a further delay. Launch was eventually rescheduled for 16 February.

Launch
Sentinel-3A was successfully launched on 16 February 2016 at 17:57 UTC from the Plesetsk Cosmodrome aboard a Rokot launch vehicle. The Briz-KM upper stage fired twice to insert the spacecraft into its intended  orbit, first at 5 minutes and then at 75 minutes after launch. Spacecraft separation occurred at 79 minutes after launch, and ground controllers received the first communication from the vehicle at 92 minutes.

Operations
The first instrument switched on was OLCI. It made its first picture on 29 February 2016, capturing Svalbard island along with a part of the arctic ice pack near solar terminator.

See also
Sentinel-3#Instruments

References

External links

 Sentinel-3 program website by ESA
 Sentinel-3 website by the Copernicus Programme
Real-time orbital tracking - uphere.space

Copernicus Programme
Earth observation satellites of the European Space Agency
Earth satellite radar altimeters
Spacecraft launched by Rokot rockets
Spacecraft launched in 2016
Oceanographic satellites